A fourth referendum on the Compact of Free Association was held in Palau on 2 December 1986, after the previous three referendums had failed to achieve the 75% in favour necessary. Voters were asked whether they approved of the Compact of Free Association between Palau and the United States signed on 10 January 1986. It was approved by 66.0% of voters, with a turnout of 82.0%.

Results

References

1986 referendums
1986 in Palau
Referendums in Palau